Soridium is a genus of parasitic plants in the Triuridaceae, lacking chlorophyll and obtaining nutrients from fungi in the soil. It contains only one known species, Soridium spruceanum, native to Brazil, Venezuela, Suriname, French Guiana, Belize and Guatemala.

References

External links
La Chaussette Rouge, Soridium spruceanum

Pandanales genera
Monotypic Pandanales genera
Parasitic plants
Triuridaceae